Tate's Voyage or  De Trip van Teetje  is a 1998 Dutch film directed by Paula van der Oest.

Plot
Tate (Teetje) and his friends rob a jewelry store in the middle of the night. The guards catch them red handed, but they manage to escape with the loot, which consists mainly of Rolexes. It becomes clear that this type of criminality is a habit for Tate, but when he meets his girlfriend Mary, he promises her to 'quit the life'. In order to do so, he buys a Russian ship that is offered to him for €100,000 and was said to have electronics on board, worth at least two million. To be able to buy the ship, he borrows money from his friends with whom he did the robbery, thinking that he can easily pay them back shortly. After the purchase is complete, Tate visits the ship and finds out that there is a 30-man Russian crew on board, and only little food. He also finds out that along with the ship, he also bought a €200,000 debt to Yugoslavia and hence, the ship has been chained. On top of that, it turns out that the crew hasn't been paid any wages for the past three years, which is the time the Russian crew have been stuck on board the ship in the Rotterdam harbour.

As Tate is unable to pay his friends back, they threaten to kill him if he doesn't pay within a few days. He hides on board the ship, but the ship is running out of supplies, and more and more crew members are getting sick. When Tate's friends, unable to find Tate, threaten to hurt Mary, he brings her on board. As Mary is a nurse at the Catholic hospital of Rotterdam, she starts to treat the ill crew members. First mate Nikolaj falls in love with Mary and Mary finds out she has feelings for him, too. She later confesses that she gave up her virginity for him.

End plot
As the food runs out, Tate manages to persuade a local supermarket to donate 30 boxes of food. The crew however finds this not enough and threatens Tate to kill Mary if they do not return to Russia soon. Desperate as he is, Tate visits the captain of the ship in the hospital. The captain tells him that he should get rid of the cargo as soon as he can, as the cargo was shipped from Chernobyl nuclear power plant and thus is radioactive. Tate discovers that Mary and Nikolaj have an affair, returns to the ship, and gives Nikolaj his passport, cellphone and the key to his home. Nikolaj and Mary leave the ship, and Tate, so far unable to speak Russian, orders in Russian to prepare the ship and set sail for Russia. The film ends with the whole crew, including Tate, singing Russian sailor's songs.

Cast
Boris Abarov	... 	Kapitein
Cynthia Abma	... 	Karin
Abdenbi Azzaoui	... 	Hassan
Ron Christian Boom	... 	Bewaker Ron
Cilly Dartell	... 	Verslaggeefster
Nikolaj Dohorin	... 	Nieuwe Rus
Cees Geel	... 	Theo 'Teetje' van Nierhof
Herman Grootaers		
Dimitri Ivanov	... 	Nikolaj
István Jeney	... 	Tolk
Serge Latychav	... 	Dirigent
Louis Laurijssens		
Simon van Leeuwen	... 	Middenstander
Re Leonie	... 	Moeder
Peteris Liepins		
Ruud Louisse	... 	Bewaker 2
Jaap Maarleveld	... 	Havenmeester
Wolter Muller	... 	Boris
Albert Muske	... 	Schilder
Thekla Reuten	... 	Mary
Henk Strijbos	... 	Douanebeambte
Dimme Treurniet	... 	Ger
Piet van Velzen		
Fred Visser		
Leonid Vlasov	... 	Machinist
Wlad Vogtushenko		
Olej Yemelyanov	... 	Koorlid

External links 
 

Dutch drama films
1998 films
1990s Dutch-language films